Back 2 tha Clap is the fifth solo studio album by American rapper Kokane. It was released on July 18, 2006 via SMC Recordings. Audio production of the entire record was handled by Fingazz. It featured guest appearances from Kurupt, Roscoe, Pro, KM.G, 40 Glocc, Down, and R.Ill.

Track listing 
 Intro
 Back 2 Tha Clap
 The Streets are Callin' (featuring Kurupt & Roscoe)
 Straight Coats
 Sucka Sandwiches
 Gangsta'd Up (featuring Pro & 40 Glocc)
 If It's All the Same (featuring KM.G)
 #1 Baby Boo (featuring Fingazz)
 Hard Timin'
 Lil' Homies
 Bienvenidos a California (featuring Down)
 The Monkey Was Funky
 Can't Funk-Shun (featuring Sheldon Fisher on guitar)
 When It Rains It Pours (featuring Down & R.III)

Personnel
 Jerry B. Long, Jr. – main artist
 Down a.k.a. Kilo – featured artist (tracks 11, 14)
 David Brown – featured artist (track 3)
 Ricardo Brown – featured artist (track 3)
 Lawrence White – featured artist (track 6)
 Pro – featured artist (track 6)
 Kevin Michael Gulley – featured artist (track 7)
 John Stary – featured artist (track 8), producer
 Monte "Mont Rock" Malone – executive producer
 Marc Rustigian – mastering
 Sheldon Fisher – guitar (track 13)
 Oscar Varela – cover art

References

2006 albums
Kokane albums
SMC Recordings albums